Brimstone & Treacle is the soundtrack for the 1982 film adaptation of the play Brimstone and Treacle directed by Richard Loncraine and starring Denholm Elliott,  Joan Plowright and Sting. Sting and The Police wrote most of the original material on the album. The rest of the soundtrack was made of songs by other acts signed to A&M like The Go-Go's and Squeeze and a couple of traditional songs performed by the Finchley Children's Music Group and the ad-hoc formed Brimstone Chorale.

The Police's "I Burn for You" is a song Sting originally wrote for the band Last Exit in the mid-1970s; he later offered it to The Police for Zenyatta Mondatta in 1980, but it was deemed "too sentimental" for their musical direction. The band eventually chose to record it for their fourth album Ghost In The Machine the following year, but it did not make the cut. Stewart Copeland's roadie Jeff Seitz played drums on "Only You" while the voice of actress Suzanna Hamilton can be heard on The Police's "A Kind of Loving". Words from the original play by Dennis Potter form the lyrics of "Narration".

Sting's cover of "Spread a Little Happiness" was released as a single and it reached number 16 in the UK charts. The title track was also awarded the 1984 Grammy Award for Best Rock Instrumental Performance, making Sting a three-time winner in this particular category, The Police being recipients of the award in 1981 and 1982—although Sting had no part in the band's "Behind My Camel", the 1982 award winner which he did not write and on which he refused to play. Sting would later go on to perform "I Burn for You" live during his The Dream of the Blue Turtles tour in 1985. That version is featured on his Bring on the Night live album.

Track listing

Personnel 
 Brimstone Chorale – Performer
 The Go-Go's – Performer
 The Police – Performer
 Jeff Seitz – Drums on "Only You". 
 Squeeze – Performer
 Sting – Performer
 Kenith Trodd – Producer

Notes 

The Police
Sting (musician) soundtracks
1982 soundtrack albums
A&M Records soundtracks
Grammy Award for Best Rock Instrumental Performance
New wave soundtracks